Deger is a surname. Notable people with the surname include:

Ernst Deger (1809–1885), German painter
Steve Deger, American author

See also
Degner
Dever
Heger

Surnames from given names